The 1986 United States Senate election in Oklahoma was held on November 3, 1986. Incumbent Republican U.S. Senator Don Nickles won re-election to his second term.

Democratic primary

Candidates
James R. Jones, Representative for Oklahoma's 1st district

Results

Results

See also 
 1986 United States Senate elections

References 

 https://www.ourcampaigns.com/RaceDetail.html?RaceID=3663

Oklahoma
1986
1986 Oklahoma elections